The Kingdom of Georgia, a Christian kingdom in the Caucasus, was subjected, between 1386 and 1403, to several disastrous invasions by the armies of Turco-Mongol conqueror Timur, whose vast empire stretched, at its greatest extent, from Central Asia into Anatolia.  These conflicts were intimately linked with the wars between Timur (Tamerlane) and Tokhtamysh, the last khan of the Golden Horde and Timur's major rival for control over the Islamic world.Although he was able to invade parts of Georgia, he was never able to make the country Muslim and even recognized Georgia as a Christian state.

In the first of eight invasions, Timur sacked Georgia's capital, Tbilisi, and captured the king Bagrat V in 1386. Georgian resistance prompted a renewed attack by the Turco-Mongol armies. Bagrat's son and successor, George VII, put up a stiff resistance and had to spend much of his reign (1395–1405) fighting the Timurid invasions. Timur personally led most of these raids to subdue the recalcitrant Georgian monarch. He was not able to establish a firm control over Georgia. By the time George VII was forced to accept Timur's terms of peace and agree to pay tribute, he was a master of little more than "gutted towns, ravaged countryside and a shattered monarchy."

History 

Timur's first appearance in the Caucasus was a response to Khan Tokhtamysh's marauding inroad into Northern Iran through the Caucasian lands in 1385. This marked an outbreak of outright hostility between the two Islamic monarchs. Timur responded by launching a full-scale invasion of the small frontier countries, which lay between the western border of his emerging empire and Tokhtamysh's khanate. After having overrun Azerbaijan and Kars, Timur marched into Georgia. The official history of his reign, Zafarnama, represents this campaign in Georgia as a jihad. Timur set out from Kars and assailed Samtskhe, the southernmost principality within the Kingdom of Georgia later in 1386. From there, he marched against Tbilisi which the Georgian king Bagrat V had fortified. The city fell on November 21, 1386, and King Bagrat V was captured and converted to Islam at sword point. The Georgian Chronicles and Thomas of Metsoph mention the apostasy of the king but represent it as a clever ruse which enabled him to earn a degree of Timur's trust. Bagrat was given some 12,000 troops to reestablish himself in Georgia, whose government was run by Bagrat's son and co-ruler George VII during his father's absence at Timur's court. The old king, however, entered into secret negotiations with George, who ambushed Bagrat's Islamic escort, and freed his father.

In the spring of 1387, Timur returned to Georgia to take revenge for the ambush and escape. Bagrat and George managed to evacuate the civilian population of the frontier regions to the mountains and forests, and began organising their defences. Khan Tokhtamysh's reappearance in Iran forced Timur to temporarily withdraw. However once the Golden Horde was defeated, Timur returned to attack Georgia again. In 1394, he dispatched four generals to the province of Samtskhe.Timur in person punished the mountainous Georgian communities in the Aragvi Valley whom the Zafarnama calls Kara-Kalkanlik ("with black bucklers”, i.e., the eastern Georgian mountaineers, the Pshavs and Khevsurs), and returned via Tbilisi to Shekki upon hearing of yet another offensive by Tokhtamysh.

In 1395 the desperate Georgians allied themselves with Sidi Ali of Shekki and inflicted a crushing defeat on the invading armies of Miran Shah, a son of Timur, who was besieging Alindjak (near Nakhichevan), and captured the Jalayirid prince Tahir, who was shut up in it. This event prompted Timur to return, later in 1399, to inflict massive revenge on the general population of the region. He took Shekki and devastated the neighboring region of Kakheti.

In the spring of 1400, Timur moved back to destroy the Georgian state once and for all. He demanded that George VII should hand over the Jalayirid Tahir. George VII refused and met Timur at the Sagim River in Lower Kartli, but suffered a defeat and retreated deeper into the country, relentlessly chased by Timur. Timur destroyed the Georgian capital Tbilisi, left a garrison there, and laid siege to Gori, where George was entrenched. The king made a bold sortie westward, but having failed to thwart the enemy's advance at the fortresses of Dzami and Savaneti, fled to the inaccessible forests of western Georgia, where the armies of the Islamic ruler could not penetrate. Timur turned back in fury and thoroughly pillaged the rest of Georgia. This bloody campaign lasted for several months, with Timur's armies systematically moving from province to province. Virtually all major cities and towns were destroyed and their populations decimated; the countryside (with its villages and food sources) was burnt; monasteries and churches were systematically razed to the ground. Of those who survived the fighting and reprisals, many thousands died of hunger and disease, and 60,000 survivors were enslaved and carried away by Timur's troops.

In late 1401, Timur invaded the Caucasus once again. George VII had to sue for peace, and sent his brother with tribute. Timur was preparing for a major confrontation with the Ottoman dynasty and apparently wished to freeze the currently prevailing situation in Georgia, until he could return to deal with it more decisively and thoroughly at his leisure. Thus, he made peace with George on condition that the king of Georgia supplied him with troops and granted Muslims special privileges. Timur nonetheless undertook some preventive measures and attacked the Georgian garrison of Tortumi, demolishing the citadel and looting the surrounding area.

Once the Ottomans were defeated, Timur, back in Erzurum in 1402, decided to punish the king of Georgia for not having come to present his congratulations on his victory. George VII's brother, Constantine, who was then on bad terms with his brother, arrived with gifts, as did the king's defiant vassal Iwane Jaqeli, prince of Samtskhe. Sheikh Ibrahim I of Shirvan went to estimate the revenues and expenses of Georgia. George sent new presents but Timur refused them and summoned George to appear in person. In the meantime, he himself laid siege to the previously impregnable fortress of Birtvisi, stubbornly defended by a tiny Georgian garrison. Having captured the fortress in August 1403, Timur sent his army to plunder and clear the frontier regions of Georgia and set out in pursuit of the retreating king George VII as far as Abkhazia. Timur's historian reports that 700 towns were destroyed and their inhabitants massacred.

Timur only stopped his army when the ulema and the mufti decided it was possible to grant the king of Georgia clemency (aman). George VII had to pay a huge tribute, including 1,000 tankas of gold struck in the name of Timur, 1,000 horses, a ruby weighing 18 mithkals, etc, in exchange Timur would recognize Georgia as a Christian kingdom and the kingdom could retain its independence. Timur then passed through Tbilisi, destroying all monasteries and churches on his way, and went to Beylagan early in 1404. All the territories from Beylagan to Trebizond were officially given by Timur as an appanage to his grandson Khalil Mirza. Timur then finally left the Caucasus and headed for Central Asia, where he died on February 19, 1405, while preparing for a massive invasion of China.

References 

Wars involving the Kingdom of Georgia
Invasions of Georgia (country)
Georgia
Spread of Islam
Religion-based wars
Military history of Islam
Islam and violence
Invasions
Georgia

1380s conflicts
1390s conflicts
1400s conflicts
14th century in the Kingdom of Georgia
15th century in the Kingdom of Georgia
1380s in Asia
1390s in Asia
1400s in Asia
1400s in Europe
Islam in the Caucasus